The Armstrong Whitworth Ara was an unsuccessful British single-seat biplane fighter aircraft of the First World War built by Armstrong Whitworth.

Design and development
In early 1918, the British Air Ministry wrote RAF Specification Type 1 for a single-seat fighter to replace the Sopwith Snipe. The specified engine was the ABC Dragonfly, a new radial engine which had been ordered into production based on promised performance before any testing had been carried out. To meet this specification, Armstrong Whitworth's chief designer, Fred Murphy, produced the Armstrong Whitworth Ara, three prototypes being ordered.

The Ara was a two-bay biplane. It had a square fuselage, the engine was covered in a pointed cowling, but with the cylinder heads exposed. The upper wing was low to give the pilot a better upwards view.

As with the other fighters built to meet the Type 1 specification, the Dragonfly engine proved to be the Ara's undoing, demonstrating hopeless reliability.  Two of the three prototypes were completed, the first flying in mid-1919.  The Ara was abandoned towards the end of the year when Armstrong Whitworth closed down its aircraft department.

Specifications

See also

Notes

References
  
  
 

1910s British fighter aircraft
Ara
Biplanes
Single-engined tractor aircraft
Aircraft first flown in 1919